The fifth season of the Naruto: Shippuden anime series is directed by Hayato Date, and produced by Studio Pierrot and TV Tokyo. They are based on Part II for Masashi Kishimoto's manga series. The fifth season aired from December 2008 to June 2009 on TV Tokyo. A total of six volumes were published by Aniplex between June 3, 2009 and November 4, 2011. This season follows the leaf ninjas including Naruto Uzumaki, attempting to stop the Three-Tails, and help a boy named Yukimaru.

The English dub of the season aired on Disney XD from July 30 to November 5, 2011. Episodes 89 to 98 were broadcast until the show was removed from Disney XD's schedule, citing the more frequent violence shown later on in the anime. The season premiered on Neon Alley starting with episode 99 from December 29, 2012 to January 7, 2013. The complete season would make its English television debut on Adult Swim's Toonami programming block and premiere from November 15, 2015 to May 15, 2016.

The first twelve episodes were collected in a DVD box by Viz Media on October 11, 2011. Additionally, Manga Entertainment collected the first episodes alongside the last ones from the previous season on November 7, 2011 in a 2-disc DVD set in the United Kingdom.

The season uses five musical themes: two opening themes and three ending themes. "Closer" by Joe Inoue is used as the opening theme for episodes 89-102. The first ending theme is "Long Kiss Good Bye" by Halcali used only for the first two episodes.  by Dev Parade was used as the ending for episodes 91-102.


Episode list

Home releases

Japanese

English

Notes

References

General
 
 
 

Specific

2008 Japanese television seasons
2009 Japanese television seasons
Shippuden Season 05